The Compra National High School is an institution for high school students and a former extension campus of the Liloy NHS located at Barangay Compra, a southern part of the municipality along the National Highway, Liloy, Zamboanga del Norte, Philippines. It was founded on June 22, 1999, and nationalized in August 2007.

High schools in the Philippines
Schools in Zamboanga del Norte